Jacques Despierre (born 6 May 1928) is a French Catholic bishop, and bishop emeritus of Carcassonne since 2004. He was born in Toulouse.

Life
He was ordained a priest in Toulouse for the Prado Institute on 24 June 1952. He was appointed Bishop of Carcassonne on 25 August 1982 and was consecrated on 10 October that year by Bishop André Collini. On 28 June 2004 he retired for reasons of age. Bishop Alain Planet succeeded him as bishop of Carcassonne.

References 

1928 births
Possibly living people
20th-century Roman Catholic bishops in France
Bishops of Carcassonne
Clergy from Toulouse